The wardroom is the mess cabin or compartment on a warship or other military ship for commissioned naval officers above the rank of midshipman.  Although the term typically applies to officers in a navy, it is also applicable to marine officers and coast guard officers in those nations that have such service branches. On larger vessels, such as aircraft carriers of the United States Navy, there may be more than one wardroom.  It may also be used on stone frigates to refer to similar officer mess facilities at naval, marine, and coast guard installations ashore.

Terminology
The term the wardroom is also used (metonymically) to refer to those individuals with the right to occupy that wardroom, meaning 'the officers of the wardroom'.

Usage
The wardroom provides a place of rest, relaxation and recreation, as well as being an officers' dining room.  Usually, a galley or scullery adjoins the wardroom.  Table service is provided by stewards, now known in some services as mess specialists or culinary specialists.

On warships other than those of the  U.S. Navy, there is usually a bar where alcoholic drinks may be purchased.  Ships may be either 'wet' or 'dry': the former allowing the consumption of alcohol whilst at sea (though may still be prohibited during action stations), whilst a dry ship only allows alcohol to be consumed when alongside at port, if at all.  Ships of the United States Navy have not allowed alcohol consumption onboard since 1913, although since 1980 unique, by exception, single-day waivers have been granted to vessels deployed in excess of 60 days without a port call.

Etiquette

Wardrooms have rules governing etiquette and military customs.  Traditionally considered taboo are three topics: politics, religion, and sex (earlier guidebooks referred to the latter as 'ladies', this being changed as increasing numbers of female officers joined the wardrooms of warships and coast guard cutters).  On large ships in peacetime, talking about professional business is also frowned upon.  It is also considered inappropriate to perform work, or to meet with subordinates in a wardroom.  Typically, upon entering the wardroom at meal time, members ask permission from the most senior officer present before joining the table.

The ship's executive officer is usually the mess president. On warships and coast guard vessels, the commanding officer is normally not a member of the wardroom, but is invited to join the members for special occasions.

Of significant note in ships wardrooms of the Royal Navy is the daily toast to the monarch.  In all other circumstances and settings, those toasting the monarch would first rise to their feet and face the monarch before raising their glass and declaring their affirmation.  In ships wardrooms, officers remain seated to toast the monarch.  This practice came about following the permission of King William IV; when the King who was dining in a wardroom aboard a warship himself rose to return the compliment and banged his head, due to the low headroom height between warship decks of the period.

Gallery

References

Ship compartments
Royal Navy
Military terminology

pl:Mesa (żeglarstwo)
ru:Кают-компания